{{Taxobox
| name = Okenia kendi
| image = 
| image_width = 
| image_caption = 
| regnum = Animalia
| phylum = Mollusca
| classis = Gastropoda
| unranked_superfamilia = clade Heterobranchia
clade Euthyneura
clade Nudipleura
clade Nudibranchia
clade Euctenidiacea
clade Doridacea
| superfamilia = Onchidoridoidea
| familia = Goniodorididae
| genus = Okenia
| species = O. kendi
| binomial = Okenia kendi| binomial_authority = Gosliner, 2004
}}Okenia kendi is a species of sea slug, specifically a dorid nudibranch, a marine gastropod mollusc in the family Goniodorididae.

Distribution
This species was described from Luzon Island, Philippines. It has also been reported from Timor and the Lembeh Strait, Sulawesi.

Description
This Okenia'' has a broad body and eight pairs of long lateral papillae. There is a single papilla on the back, in front of the gills. The body is translucent white and there is a broad brown band which runs from between the rhinophores to the tail, encircling the gills and running down the tail. There is a brown line on the side of the foot, just below the lateral papillae. The outer two thirds of the papillae are also brown, often with a purple iridescent hue at the tips.

Ecology
The diet of this species is an encrusting bryozoan.

References

External links
 

Goniodorididae
Gastropods described in 2004